Bishesh Huirem is an Indian actress and model from the Meitei ethnicity of Manipur. She is best known for representing India at the Miss International Queen for Transgender 2016 organised in Pattaya, Thailand. She is the first Indian transgender who represents her country in the Miss International Beauty Queen Contest. She is the first Indian transgender to be appointed as a state icon for the parliamentary polls in the Lok Sabha elections. She is the first transgender to win the "Best Actor Award" in the 14th Manipur State Film Awards, 2022. Ang Tamo, It's Not My Choice  and Apaiba Leichil are some of her notable films.

2016 Apology Demand Incident  
On 13 September 2016, Bishesh Huirem was allegedly beaten up by the personal security guards and armed personnels of Rural Development Minister Moirangthem Okendra in Imphal, Manipur. The incident happened in a road rage at around 10 pm during night. Consequently, Bishesh protested and served an ultimatum to Minister Okendra to apologize for the incident within seven days or face outcomes. However, the officials of the Minister rejected her claim over the incident. According to them, Bishesh was driving “dead drunk” and was even not able to reverse her car which was blocking the minister's security escorts. Further, the minister's officials said that Bishesh was throwing tantrums claiming she had the right to drive and even attempted to forcibly open the minister's vehicle's door. In response, Bishesh denied all the claims from the minister's officials as "baseless charges". She denied she was drunk. She clarified that she was not even consuming salt and oil in her diet for her hormone therapy in a preparation for a beauty contest. Shocked by the incident, she was hospitalized. The associations and organizations of various artistes banned all mobile theatres, films and music programmes in the Heirok Assembly constituency (Minister Okendra's associated Constituency) until and unless he apologized.

Filmography

Selected Shumang Kumhei Plays 

 Border
 Restafen
 Pizza
 Nupigi Thamoi
 Chagee Khuji
 Eengengee Nini Panba
 Inamma
 Tamphayai
 Kairaba Chaphu
 Kunti 4
 Ishing Chaibi
 Mou Ahum Ningol Ama
 Online Da Luhongba
 Sanagi Thambal
 Maogi Ibai
 Nungshi Laman

References

External links 
 Bishesh Huirem_IMDb

Meitei people
Indian actresses
Indian models
Living people
Transgender actresses
Shumang Kumhei artists
Year of birth missing (living people)